RMMV Oceanic (Royal Mail Motor Vessel) was the planned name of an unfinished ocean liner that was partially built by Harland and Wolff for the White Star Line. It would have been the third ship bearing the name Oceanic, after the one of 1870 and the one of 1899. It was envisaged in 1926, with the idea of modernizing the transatlantic service of the company.

After several years of study, the construction began in June 1928 in the Harland & Wolff shipyards in Belfast. However, the work was carried out at a slow pace and ceased in June 1929, probably because further studies relating to the propulsion were needed. The Great Depression which began the same year and the financial affair which sent Lord Kylsant to prison in 1931 put a definitive end to the construction, for which the government refused to advance funds.

Birth of the project

By the early 1910s, the White Star Line was to be able to provide regular and cost-effective transatlantic service with its three  ships. Both were assigned to the transatlantic service alongside , the only surviving ship of the initially planned trio. It quickly turned out, however, that while Majestic and Olympic had relatively equivalent profiles, reaching roughly the same speed (between  respectively) and the same passenger capacities, Homeric was significantly smaller and slower ( only). Additionally, the ship was less successful compared to its fellow liners. In fact, its career did not last long and it left the North Atlantic route in 1932, only ten years after its entry into service.

It was in August 1926 that a press release about a project from the company appeared for the first time, indicating the imminent construction of a 25-knot ship to replace Homeric. This ship must then, according to the press releases, be of a profile close to that of the Olympic-class vessels. The same year, in November, the International Mercantile Marine Co., a trust that owned the White Star Line, decided to separate from its non-American companies. The company was then bought by Owen Philipps, 1st Baron Kylsant, who integrated it into his company, the Royal Mail Steam Packet Company, the largest maritime conglomerate of the period. Lord Kylsant, who was also the owner of the Harland & Wolff shipyards in Belfast, decided to have the planned ship built there, for which studies were carried out over many months.

On 14 April 1927, construction of a fleetmate  began in Harland & Wolff. Britannic was a smaller version of the proposed liner, but of similar design. However, it was not until 18 June 1928 that a contract was signed to build the proposed liner, construction began ten days later. The liner was to be named Oceanic, in reference to the very first liner put into service by the company after its purchase by Thomas Henry Ismay in 1871. Construction of the ship's keel began with great fanfare ten days after the contract was signed. If the only existing plans of the ship remained sketchy and only allowed for understanding the general arrangement, they did give an idea of the capacity of the liner, designed to carry 722 passengers in first class, 464 in second, and 1,096 in third, and also 240 interchangeable seats between first and second class, and 286 between second and third, for a total of 2,808 passengers.

Economic crisis and cancellation

However, construction was proceeding at a very slow pace, to such an extent that a year later, the keel was still not completed. White Star proposed having over 40 diesel generator sets driving four propellers through geared electric motors. Harland and Wolff was reluctant to adopt this system, preferring to continue the use of trusted steam turbine propulsion as it seemed that not testing a new type of engine by installing it on smaller ships first was perilous. A compromise of sorts was reached and the final design used four conventional low-speed 'cathedral' diesel engines, each directly driving one propeller shaft - which would have made Oceanic the first quadruple-screw motor ship. Despite construction on Oceanic slowing down, construction of the smaller Britannic continued without issues.

Further work on Oceanic was postponed after which the keel was coated in preservative oil in hopes construction would resume but the project was later cancelled due to the Great Depression and the collapse of the Royal Mail Steam Packet Company, owners of the White Star Line, as a result of the financial problems of Sir Owen Philips, Lord Kylsant. The Royal Mail Case, as it was known, led to the imprisonment of Kylsant, and to substantial changes in accounting and auditing practice.  Loans backed by the governments of England and Northern Ireland intended for the construction of Oceanic were diverted to complete the construction of Britannic, as well as to start construction of a sister ship to Britannic named . These two liners were partially built with steel plates ordered for Oceanic, whose partially built hull was subsequently dismantled and reused on Britannic and Georgic after the aforementioned diversion of funds.

Legacy

In total, of the estimated cost of £3.5 million, £150,000 was spent on Oceanics design and start of construction. These sums were not, however, totally lost. Part of the design indeed inspired , a smaller ship which largely reproduced the silhouette of the aborted ship, in particular its packed funnels and its motor propulsion. The liner entered service in 1930 and enjoyed some success. To replace Oceanic, a sister ship of Britannic, was built and put into service in 1932. Georgic differed in appearance from Britannic in that the forward part of her superstructure and bridge was rounded instead of straight, and the front part of her promenade deck was covered. These features were carried over to Georgic from Oceanic.

However, these two liners could not replace large ships like Majestic and Olympic. The construction of a large liner therefore remained on the agenda. The Cunard Line also had to stop the construction of its own large liner because of the economic crisis. Neville Chamberlain, then Chancellor of the Exchequer pushed the two companies (White Star and Cunard) to merge in 1934, with the promise to help them finish the liner. In 1947 Cunard purchased White Star's interest, and by 1949 the company had dropped the White Star name and was renamed Cunard Line. Despite this, Cunard continued to operate the Britannic and Georgic. In 1956, Georgic was sold for scrap, leaving Britannic as the last liner of the White Star Line in service. In 1960, Cunard sold the Britannic for scrap, thus removing the last traces of the cancelled Oceanic.

Appearance-wise, the planned Oceanic had certain features that make it akin to the liner , including the three packed funnels that contrasted with the tall pipes of older ships. Designed shortly after Oceanic, Normandie was the first to exceed the symbolic barrier of 300 meters in length and 30 knots in speed that the White Star Line was aiming for.

References

Bibliography

External links
 Proposed RMS Oceanic III
 M.V. Oceanic

 

Ships of the White Star Line
Cancelled ships
Ships built by Harland and Wolff